The Writers' Union of Canada (TWUC), founded in 1973, describes itself as supporting "the country's authors by advocating for their rights, freedoms, and economic well-being." Its members are professional writers who must have published at least one book.

The union addresses government and industry about public lending rights, tax reform, copyright legislation, freedom of expression and other industry issues.

The union also provides publications, professional development programs, contract advice, grievance assistance, manuscript evaluation service, group health benefits, funding for public and school readings and numerous opportunities for communication and networking within the industry.

The union administers the Danuta Gleed Literary Award for the best first collection of short stories in English published in Canada. The union also administers the Writing for Children Competition, Postcard Story Contest, and Short Prose Competition.

Each year the union awards the Freedom to Read Award. Recipients have included authors Derek Finkle and Charles Montpetit as well as former MP Wendy Lill, Toronto lawyer Clayton Ruby, and Janine Fuller, owner of Vancouver's embattled Little Sisters bookstore.

Heather Menzies is the chair of the Writers' Union of Canada. John Degen is its executive director. Past chairs have included noted authors Marian Engel, Margaret Atwood, Pierre Berton, June Callwood, Timothy Findley, Graeme Gibson, Susan Musgrave, Paul Quarrington, Maggie Siggins, Susan McCaslin and Susan Swan.

TWUC is based in Toronto.

References
The Canadian Encyclopedia: Writers' Union of Canada
Parliament of Canada: The Challenge of Change: A Consideration of the Canadian Book Industry - Chapter Four: Writers and Creators
The Canadian Artists and Producers Professional Relations Tribunal - Certification Order - The Writers' Union of Canada (November 17, 1998)
CBC Arts: Writers' Union 'aghast' at library cuts

External links

Records of Vancouver Industrial Writers Union are held by Simon Fraser University's Special Collections and Rare Books
 List of members, 2017 (choice)

Non-profit organizations based in Toronto
Arts organizations established in 1973
Canadian writers' organizations